Quarantine (German: Quarantäne) is a 1923 German silent film directed by Max Mack and starring Rudolf Lettinger, Helena Makowska and Loni Nest.

Cast
 Rudolf Lettinger as Professor Hudson  
 Helena Makowska as Sein Frau  
 Loni Nest as Kind  
 Oskar Marion as Burns  
 Robert Leffler as Hausarzt  
 Robert Garrison as Matrose  
 Hans Karl Georg as Hafeninspektor  
 Kurt Katch as Hafenarzt  
 Alfred Schmasow as Stellenvermittler  
 Robert Scholz as Prinz  
 Marga Lindt as Zofe  
 Frau Wanna as Children's overseer  
 Marian Alma as Servant  
 Heinrich George

References

Bibliography
 Hans-Michael Bock and Tim Bergfelder. The Concise Cinegraph: An Encyclopedia of German Cinema. Berghahn Books.

External links

1923 films
Films of the Weimar Republic
Films directed by Max Mack
German silent feature films
German black-and-white films